The Fakenham Academy (formerly Fakenham High School and College) is a coeducational secondary school and sixth form located at Field Lane Fakenham, Norfolk, England.
The school offers GCSEs and BTECs as programmes of study. Pupils in the sixth form can choose to study from a range of A Levels and BTECs.

History
The school converted to with academy status in 2013 after previously receiving a 'inadequate' rating in an Ofsted report. In the most recent OFSTED inspection (2019) Fakenham Academy was rated as a "Good" school. The original multi academy trust was the TEN group, but it moved to the Sapientia Education Trust in June 2020.

Wells Road
The sixth form used to occupy the detached Wells Road site. The college was set in the grade II-listed Highfield House, a Georgian building set in spacious grounds. It was built in 1823 as a private villa.  one hundred years later, in September 1923, it was converted into an all-boys secondary school which in 1946, after the introduction of the Education Act 1944,  became Fakenham Grammar School.

In 2003, part of the building was destroyed in a fire. In 2017, the Wells Road site was relealesed to housing. Matthew Parr-Burman, principal said, “As much as we are all very fond of the historic Wells Road building, it sadly no longer provides a suitable environment in which to learn and costs a huge amount to maintain,”

Academics
Fakenham Academy's desires to provide an "outstanding" quality of education to meet the needs of the local community and local context. Subject content, topic progression, time allocation, teaching and learning approaches and student groupings are tailored towards this goal. 
 A limiting fact is the temporary reduced number of students in the current cohorts.

Curriculum
Virtually all maintained schools and academies follow the National Curriculum, and are inspected by Ofsted on how well they succeed in delivering a 'broad and balanced curriculum'. The school has to decide whether Key Stage 3 contains years 7, 8 and 9- or whether year 9 should be in Key Stage 4 and the students just study subjects that will be examined by the GCSE exams at 16.  Fakenham has chosen the former approach.
In Key Stage 3, students are taught in mixed ability bands in all subjects and within ability groups in Mathematics. Support groups exist in English, Mathematics, Science and Humanities. In Key Stage 4, students are taught in ability groups in Mathematics, banded ability groups within English and Science and in mixed ability classes in option subjects.

Key Stage 3

From Year 7 to Year 9, students study art, Design and Technology, Drama, English, French, Geography, History, Learning for Life, Mathematics, Music, Physical Education, Science and Spanish.

Key Stage 4

All students study the core subjects of English Language GCSE, English Literature GCSE, Mathematics GCSE, Learning for Life, PE and Science GCSE Triple Science comprising Biology GCSE, Chemistry GCSE and Physics GCSE or Combined Science. Students have four options choices that include GCSE languages, Art GCSE, Music, Geography and History. This makes it possible to obtain an English Baccalaureate.

Other BTECs and GCSEs are offered subject to demand and staffing:
Business GCSE, Computer Science GCSE, Design and Technology (Product Design or Textiles) GCSE, Drama GCSE, Philosophy and Ethics GCSE, Film Studies GCSE,  Health and Social Care BTEC Tech Award Level 1,  BTEC Level 1/Level 2 Tech Award in Digital Information, Catering Level 1/Level 2 Award and BTEC Level 1/Level 2 First Award in Sport.

Notable alumni
Matt Gill, former Norwich City footballer
Ryan Jarvis, footballer
Rossi Jarvis, footballer 
Adam Tann played professionally for Cambridge United and Leyton Orient
Sam Riviere, award-winning poet

References

External links
Fakenham Academy official website

Secondary schools in Norfolk
Educational institutions established in 1959
1959 establishments in England
Academies in Norfolk
Fakenham